Wolf Isaac Blitzer (born March 22, 1948) is an American journalist, television news anchor, and author who has been a CNN reporter since 1990, and who currently serves as one of the principal anchors at the network. He is the host of The Situation Room with Wolf Blitzer and until 2021, served as the network's lead political anchor.

Early life
Blitzer was born in Augsburg, Bavaria, Germany near Munich in 1948, during post-World War II Allied occupation the son of Cesia Blitzer (née Zylberfuden), a homemaker, and David Blitzer, a home builder. His parents were Polish Jewish refugees from German-occupied Poland who survived the Auschwitz concentration camp; his grandparents, two uncles, and two aunts on his father's side were all murdered there. Blitzer and his family immigrated to the United States under the provisions of the 1948 Displaced Persons Act. He was raised in Buffalo, New York, and graduated from Kenmore West Senior High School. He received a Bachelor of Arts in history from the State University of New York at Buffalo in 1970. While there, he was a member of Alpha Epsilon Pi. In 1972, he received a Master of Arts in International Relations from the Johns Hopkins University School of Advanced International Studies. While at Johns Hopkins, he studied abroad at the Hebrew University of Jerusalem, where he learned Hebrew.

Blitzer has said he has frequently been asked about his name, which has been characterized as seemingly made for TV. He explained that his surname goes back for generations, and that "Wolf" is the same first name as that of his maternal grandfather.

Career

Washington and Jerusalem
Blitzer began his career in journalism in the early 1970s, in the Tel Aviv bureau of the Reuters news agency. In 1973, he caught the eye of Jerusalem Post editor Ari Rath, who hired Blitzer as a Washington correspondent for the English-language Israeli newspaper. Blitzer remained with The Jerusalem Post until 1990, covering both American politics and developments in the Middle East.

Fluent in Hebrew, Blitzer also published articles in several Hebrew-language newspapers. Under the name Ze'ev Blitzer, he wrote for Al HaMishmar. Using the name Ze'ev Barak, he had work published in Yedioth Ahronoth. Ze'ev (זאב) is the Hebrew word for "wolf", and Barak (ברק) is the Hebrew word for "lightning" (which in German/Yiddish is Blitz/blits).

In the mid-1970s, Blitzer also worked for the American Israel Public Affairs Committee (AIPAC) as the editor of their monthly publication, the Near East Report. While at AIPAC, Blitzer's writing focused on Middle East affairs as they relate to United States foreign policy.

At an April 1977 White House press conference, Blitzer asked Egyptian leader Anwar Sadat why Egyptian scholars, athletes and journalists were not permitted to visit Israel. Sadat responded that such visits would be possible after an end to the state of belligerence between the two nations. In November of that year, Sadat made a historic visit to Israel, and Blitzer covered the negotiations between the two countries from the first joint Israeli-Egyptian press conference in 1977, to the final negotiations that would lead to the signing of the Egypt–Israel peace treaty two years later.

In 1985, Blitzer published his first book, Between Washington and Jerusalem: A Reporter's Notebook (Oxford University Press, 1985). The text outlined his personal development as a reporter, and the relations between the United States and Israel.

Jonathan Pollard
In 1986, he became known for his coverage of the arrest and trial of Jonathan Pollard, a US Navy intelligence analyst who was charged with spying for Israel. Blitzer was the first journalist to interview Pollard, and he later wrote a book about the Pollard Affair titled Territory of Lies. In the book, Blitzer writes that Pollard contacted him because he had been reading Blitzer's byline for years, and because Blitzer "had apparently impressed him as someone who was sympathetic". Pollard also hoped that Blitzer would help him "reach the people of Israel, as well as the American Jewish community."

Blitzer's interview with Pollard was controversial in the context of the legal action against him, as it was construed by some media voices as a possible violation of the terms of Pollard's plea deal, which forbade media contact. Blitzer's subsequent book about the affair was included in The New York Times list of "Notable Books of the Year" for 1989. In its review, the Times praised the book as "lucid and highly readable" and called Blitzer's judgment of Israeli officials "harsh but fair".

A review in The New York Review of Books was more critical, prompting a letter from Blitzer accusing the reviewer of making several inaccurate statements. Reviewer Robert I. Friedman responded to Blitzer's criticism by characterizing Territory of Lies as "a slick piece of damage control that would make [Blitzer's] former employers at AIPAC (not to mention Israel's Defense Ministry) proud."

Pollard was released on November 20, 2015, in accordance with federal guidelines in place at the time of his sentencing.

CNN

In May 1990, Blitzer moved to CNN and worked as the cable network's military affairs reporter. His team's coverage of the first Gulf War in Kuwait won a CableACE Award and made him a household name.

In 1992, Blitzer became CNN's White House correspondent, a position he would hold until 1999. During this period, he earned an Emmy Award for his coverage of the 1995 Oklahoma City bombing. In 1998, he began hosting the CNN Sunday morning interview program Late Edition with Wolf Blitzer, which was seen in over 180 countries. Blitzer's first assignment as an anchor was on the daily newscast The World Today, in 1999. In 2000, he started anchoring his own show, Wolf Blitzer Reports, which ran until 2005.

CNN selected Blitzer to anchor their coverage of all U.S. presidential elections since 2004. Since August 8, 2005, Blitzer has hosted The Situation Room, a two-hour afternoon/early evening program on CNN.

In 2013, he began anchoring the 1pm ET hour of CNN Newsroom; in 2014, the program was renamed to Wolf. Wolf ended in 2018 and was replaced by CNN Right Now, hosted by Brianna Keilar.

In January 2021, CNN announced programming changes, shortening The Situation Room to one hour (6-7 p.m. (ET)) beginning April 26, and expanding Jake Tapper's role at the network to become Lead Washington anchor and expanded his show The Lead with Jake Tapper to 4-6 p.m. (ET). Blitzer will remain hosting documentaries and serving "a principal anchor for a major breaking news." However, Jim Acosta is now regarded as the network's "chief domestic correspondent."

In 2022, he hosted The Newscast with Wolf Blitzer on CNN's short-lived streaming service, CNN+ from its late March launch to its late April end.

Awards
Blitzer has won multiple awards, including the 2004 Journalist Pillar of Justice Award from the Respect for Law Alliance, and the 2003 Daniel Pearl Award from the Chicago Press Veterans Association. His news team was among those awarded a George Foster Peabody Award for coverage of Hurricane Katrina, an Alfred I. DuPont Award for coverage of the 1999 Southeast Asian tsunami, and an Edward R. Murrow Award for CNN's coverage of the terrorist attacks on September 11, 2001.

In November 2002, he won the American Veteran Awards' Ernie Pyle Journalism Award for military reporting. In February 2000, he received the Anti-Defamation League's Hubert H. Humphrey First Amendment Freedoms Prize. In 1999, Blitzer won the International Platform Association's Lowell Thomas Broadcast Journalism Award. Blitzer won an Emmy Award for his coverage of the Oklahoma City bombing. Blitzer was also part of the CNN team that was awarded a Golden ACE award for their 1991 Gulf War reporting. In 1994, American Journalism Review cited him and CNN as the readers' choice for the Best in the Business Award for network coverage of the Clinton administration.

In May 1999, Blitzer was awarded the honorary Doctorate in Humane Letters by the University at Buffalo. On May 20, 2007, Blitzer was awarded the honorary Doctorate of Humane Letters by the George Washington University at their undergraduate commencement exercise. On May 23, 2010, Blitzer was awarded the honorary Doctorate of Humane Letters by Niagara University at their undergraduate commencement exercise. Also, on May 14, 2011, he received an honorary Doctorate of Humane Letters from Penn State University. On September 25, 2011, Blitzer was awarded an honorary Doctorate of Humane Letters by the University of Hartford. On May 10, 2014, Blitzer received an honorary Doctorate of Humane Letters from Howard University. On September 13, 2014, Blitzer received the Golden Plate Award of the American Academy of Achievement presented by Awards Council member Rick Atkinson.

Other media appearances

On September 17, 2009, Blitzer competed on an episode of Celebrity Jeopardy!, finishing the Double Jeopardy round with negative $4,600, prompting host Alex Trebek to comment: “Wolf, things have not worked out as well as you had hoped for". Blitzer was given $1,000 to bet in Final Jeopardy!, finishing with $2,000, losing to comedian Andy Richter.

Blitzer, along with fellow CNN anchor John King, is a fan of the Washington Wizards NBA team and participates in a pre-game video update for the team at home games known as the "Wizards Situation."

Blitzer has appeared in numerous films as himself reporting on events, including the  James Bond film Skyfall. Since 2013, Blitzer has made guest appearances in Netflix's political drama House of Cards, portraying himself. He also makes a brief cameo in the 2016 movie Batman v Superman: Dawn of Justice, in Mission: Impossible – Fallout (2018), and in an episode of Ben 10: Omniverse.

Blitzer played a prominent supporting role in the 2009 documentary Back Door Channels: The Price of Peace, in which he relayed his experiences as a journalist working for the Jerusalem Post, which traces the confluence of factors that made the 1979 Peace Treaty between Israel and Egypt possible.

Personal life
Blitzer is a fan of his hometown NFL team, the Buffalo Bills.

References

External links

 CNN bio
 CNN.com – The Situation Room
 
 
 
 "Wolf Blitzer for the Defense (Department)", Jim Naureckas, FAIR Extra!, January/February 2003
 Google Video on Israel Discussion – Held Nov 1989.

1948 births
Living people
American expatriates in Israel
American Israel Public Affairs Committee
American magazine editors
American male non-fiction writers
American newspaper journalists
American people of Polish-Jewish descent
American political journalists
American television news anchors
American television reporters and correspondents
CNN people
Bavarian emigrants to the United States
Hebrew University of Jerusalem alumni
Jewish American journalists
Jewish American writers
Journalists from Upstate New York
Journalists from Washington, D.C.
Paul H. Nitze School of Advanced International Studies alumni
People from Bethesda, Maryland
Television personalities from Buffalo, New York
University at Buffalo alumni
Writers from Buffalo, New York
Writers from Maryland
20th-century American male writers
21st-century American male writers
20th-century American non-fiction writers
21st-century American non-fiction writers
21st-century American Jews